İbrahim Tatlıses (born İbrahim Tatlı in 1952) is a Turkish folk singer and former actor of Arab-Kurdish descent. Since the 1970s he has been one of the best-known and most successful singers of the pop Arabesk style. Tatlıses has recorded 42 albums, including notable albums such as Ayağında Kundura and Selam Olsun and was the host of the highly popular television programme İbo Show. He was also a leading actor that appeared in several dozen films, and also has had many business ventures.

Life

Early years
İbrahim Tatlı was born in Urfa, Turkey to an Arab father and Kurdish mother. His mother tongue is Kurdish and Arabic. He lost his father during childhood and did not attend high school. He did not know how to read or write growing up.

Musical career
İbrahim Tatlıses is often regarded as one of the best-known singers of Turkey, being so famous that he has the nicknames "İbo" and "İmparator". He has had a critically acclaimed and illustrious music career in genres such as Turkish folk music and Arabesk, beginning in 1970 at the age of 18 with his first tape Kara Kız/Beni Yakma Gel Güzelim. He sold tapes and sang at weddings/restaurants until a producer discovered him in 1976. The following year his album Ayağında Kundura, featuring songs such as Ayağında Kundura, İndim Gülüm Bağına and Kırmızı Kurdele, was a smash hit and propelled him to fame. Some of his earlier songs have Kurdish origin and were translated into Turkish. From then on, the hit albums came one after another, such as the 1983 album Yalan,
the 1985 album Mavi Mavi, and the 1987 album Allah Allah. He has recorded a total of 42 albums from 1970 to 2014.

Film and television
İbrahim Tatlıses has appeared in a total of 37 movies/TV shows, beginning in 1978 with Sabuha. In Turkey, well-known singers star in movies with the same name as the album they recently released, and thus the movies include songs from said albums. This is also seen in the 1975 Ayağında Kundura, its namesake being his smash-hit album. From there he appeared in numerous movies in the 1980s and 1990s, further cementing his colossal fame as the most famous singer and a quite well-known actor in Turkey. Aside from the cinema industry, Tatlıses hosted the critically acclaimed and highly successful İbo Show, which aired from 1993 to 2011. It was one of the most-watched and loved shows in Turkey.

Marriages
Tatlıses married his first wife, Adalet Sara, in Urfa. The couple had three children, a son named Ahmet Salim, and two daughters named Gülşen Sara and Gülden Ferrah. In 1979, he began a relationship with his Kara Yazma co-star Perihan Savaş. From his marriage to Savaş, he has a daughter named Melek Zübeyde. Savaş and Tatlıses later got divorced. In 1984, it was reported in the media that claims were made by Savaş that she was beaten for seven hours after being kidnapped by İbrahim Tatlıses, following which she applied to the prosecutor's office and asked for his arrest. Tatlıses said in his interrogation by the police, "Savaş is the mother of my child. To let her wander around would make it feel beneath me." From his relationship with his Günah co-star, Derya Tuna, he has a son, named İbrahim "İdo" Tatlıses.

After returning from Germany, Tatlıses married Ayşegül Yıldız on 27 September 2011 in the rehabilitation facility where he was receiving treatment. Mayor of Şişli Mustafa Sarıgül officiated the marriage service, while Fatih Terim was the witness. Together the couple had a daughter, named Elif Ada. They divorced in November 2013.

From his relationship with Işıl Çıtak, Tatlıses had a daughter named Dilan Çıtak, who was born in 1989. He acknowledged and accepted her as his child in 2013. In 2021, he announced his relationship with Gülçin Karakaya, who is 43 years his junior.

Assassination attempts
He was shot in the leg in 1990 and survived an assassination attempt in 1998.

On 14 March 2011, he was attacked and seriously wounded in the head. At 00:30 local time, he and his spokeswoman Buket Çakıcı were shot at by unknown assailants after leaving the offices of the private Turkish channel Beyaz TV following his weekly television show. As they entered their vehicle, Tatlises was hit with a bullet that entered the back of his skull and exited through the front. Çakıcı was also hit in the neck, but survived the attack. The perpetrators carried Kalashnikov rifles and escaped in a black car. He was taken to the Acıbadem Hospital in Istanbul for emergency treatment. He underwent a four-hour operation to have the bullet removed, after which he was in stable condition. He regained consciousness five days later. After a week, the doctors announced that he was recovering well. Turkey's Prime Minister Recep Tayyip Erdoğan visited him and also announced that he was recovering well. The police in Turkey arrested around 20 people involved in the attack. On April 7, Tatlıses left Acıbadem Hospital with a police escort and travelled to Atatürk International Airport, where he was boarded the Ministry of Health's Hawker 900XP air ambulance for Germany, to receive intensive rehabilitation at the Murnau Trauma Clinic.

Appoint Of Guardian
His son Ahmet Tatlises applied to the court because, he thought that his father was not mentally healthy. Applied to the court Appoint Of Guardian

Business
Tatlıses is involved in the restaurant and tourism businesses, as well as in construction projects with business partner Ali Sariyildiz in Iraq.

Kurdish issue
In the 1980s the Turkish government had banned the use of Kurdish; at a concert in Sweden in December 1986, he had sung folk songs in Kurdish and was thus prosecuted for separatist propaganda, but found not guilty in 1987. The charge was dismissed after he showed regret. In 1988, he was asked by businessman Mehmet Yılmaz at a cultural festival in Uşak to sing a Kurdish folk song, but refused, saying "I am a Kurd, but the laws ban me from singing in Kurdish". For this, he was indicted on September 19, 1988.

In 1994 there was evidence that Turkish counter-guerrilla organizations targeted Kurdish businessmen, including Tatlıses, İdris Ozbir, Halis Toprak, and Necdet Ulucan. In 1998 it was reported that Tatlıses offered to be an intermediary between the government and the Kurdistan Workers' Party (PKK) during the armed conflict. He recorded a song with Iranian Kurdish musician Abdollah Alijani Ardeshir.

Discography

 1970: Kara Kız/Beni Yakma Gel Güzelim
 1974: Sevdim de Sevilmedim
 1976: Ashab Gecesi
 1976: Urfa Emektaroğlu Bant Stüdyosu
 1975: Ayağında Kundura
 1977: Can Hatice
 1977: Huzurum Kalmadı
 1978: Doldur Kardeş İçelim
 1979: Toprağın Oğlu Sabuha
 1980: Bir Mumdur
 1980: Ceylan
 1981: Gelme İstemem
 1981: Gülmemiz Gerek
 1982: Yaşamak Bu Değil
 1983: Yalan
 1984: Benim Hayatım
 1985: Mavi Mavi
 1986: Gülüm Benim/Gülümse Biraz
 1987: Allah Allah/Hülya
 1988: Kara Zindan
 1988: Fosforlu Cevriyem
 1989: İnsanlar
 1990: Söylim mi?
 1991: Vur Gitsin Beni/Yemin Ettim
 1992: Ah Keşkem
 1993: Mega Aşk
 1994: Haydi Söyle 
 1995: Klasikleri
 1996: Bende İsterem
 1996: Türkü Dinle,Söyle,Oyna 
 1998: At Gitsin 
 1999: Selam Olsun 
 2001: Yetmez Mi?
 2003: Tek Tek
 2004: Aramam
 2005: Sizler İçin
 2006: İmparator Siler de Geçer
 2007: Bulamadım
 2008: Neden?
 2009: Yağmurla Gelen Kadın
 2011: Hani Gelecektin
 2014: Tatlıses Klasiği
 2018: Yaylalar
 2021: Gelmesin

Filmography

Actor

 1978: Sabuha
 1978: Ayağında Kundura
 1978: Toprağın Oğlu
 1979: Kara Yazma
 1979: Kara Çadırın Kızı
 1979: Fadile
 1980: Çile
 1980: Ayrılık Kolay Değil
 1981: Seni Yakacaklar
 1981: Yaşamak Bu Değil
 1981: Tövbe
 1982: Yalan
 1982: Alişan
 1982: Nasıl İsyan Etmem
 1983: Yorgun
 1983: Günah
 1983: Futboliye
 1984: Sevdalandım
 1984: Ayşem
 1985: Mavi Mavi
 1985: Sevmek
 1985: Yalnızım
 1986: Gülümse Biraz
 1986: Yıkılmışım Ben
 1986: Sarhoş
 1987: Gülüm Benim
 1987: Allah Allah
 1987: Dertli Dertli
 1988: Hülya
 1988: Aşıksın
 1988: Bir Kulum İşte
 1988: Kara Zindan
 1988: Ben İnsan Değil Miyim
 1989: Ceylan
 1989: Fosforlu
 1992: Aşık Oldum
 1993: Tetikçi Kemal
 1997: Fırat (mini) TV Series
 2003: Hayat Bilgisi (Mini) TV Series
 2009: Hicran Yarası

Director
 1982: Yalan
 1983: Yorgun
 1983: Günah
 1984: Ayşem
 1986: Sarhoş
 1986: Gülümse Biraz
 1986: Gülüm Benim
 1987: Dertli Dertli
 1988: Hülya
 1988: Aşıksın
 1997: Fırat (mini) TV Series
 2003: Hayat Bilgisi Konuk Oyuncu TV mini series
 2009: Hicran Yarasi 5 Bolum Konuk Oyuncu

Writer
 1983: Günah
 1998: At Gitsin
 1999: Selam Olsun
 2001: Yetmez Mi?

Producer
 1982: Yalan

References

Sources

External links

Abdollah Alijani Ardeshir on Istanbul Technical University (thmşt)no:122567/978thm
Harem Ft. İbrahim Tatlıses - Kop Gel Günahlarından - (Official Video)

1952 births
Living people
Turkish male singers
Turkish folk musicians
Turkish pop musicians
Turkish male film actors
Turkish film directors
Turkish businesspeople
Turkish Muslims
People from Şanlıurfa
Turkish people of Kurdish descent
Turkish people of Arab descent
Shooting survivors
Musicians with disabilities
Turkish folk-pop singers